The vernacular name lemon drop mangosteen is applied to two species of tropical American fruit trees.

 Garcinia intermedia
 Garcinia madruno